Hello Lisa is an album by Lisa Loeb, released on October 15, 2002 by Artemis Records. It is a re-release of the album Cake and Pie, which was released by A&M Records earlier that year.

Overview
Loeb's 2002 album Cake and Pie did not receive any major backing or promotion from A&M Records, resulting in it reaching No. 199 on the Billboard 200. Shortly after being dropped by A&M, Loeb purchased the rights to the master recordings of the songs and reworked the album as Hello Lisa. It replaces "We Could Still Belong Together", "Kick Start", "Too Fast Driving", and "She's Falling Apart" with "Did That", "What Am I Supposed to Say", and "Take Me Back".

The album is a homage to the popular character Hello Kitty, of which Loeb is a huge fan. She obtained Sanrio's permission before releasing the album.

Reception
"Underdog" peaked at No. 39 on Billboard's Adult Top 40 chart in the fall of 2002.

Track listing

References

External links
 
 

2002 albums
Lisa Loeb albums
Artemis Records albums
Hello Kitty